The McKinzie Islands are a group of small islands in the northeastern extremity of Cranton Bay, Antarctica. They were mapped by the United States Geological Survey from surveys and U.S. Navy air photos, 1960–66, and were named by the Advisory Committee on Antarctic Names for Richard H. McKinzie, U.S. Navy, a hospital corpsman at Byrd Station, 1967.

See also 
 List of Antarctic and sub-Antarctic islands

References

Islands of Ellsworth Land